Woodchuck hepatitis virus (WHV) is a species of the genus Orthohepadnavirus. It was first discovered in 1977 in a captive population of Marmota monax, but has since been discovered in wild populations in the Eastern United States.  Infected woodchucks which are unable to clear the infection inevitably develop hepatocellular carcinoma; this has led to the use of WHV in woodchucks as a model for human Hepatitis B virus infections.

References 

Animal viral diseases
Hepadnaviridae
Groundhogs